The following is a list of educational institutions in Dasmariñas, Philippines.

Universities and colleges 
 AISAT College-Dasmariñas
 Brookfield College in Cavite
 De La Salle University – Dasmariñas
 De La Salle Medical and Health Sciences Institute
 Emilio Aguinaldo College – Cavite
 Far Eastern Polytechnic College
 FEAPITSAT College of Dasmariñas
 Imus Computer College – Dasmariñas Branch
 Imus Computer College – Governor's Drive Branch
 Imus Computer College – Salawag Branch
 Marasigan Institute of Science and Technology
 National College of Science and Technology
 National University Dasmariñas
 Oxfordian Colleges
 Philippine Christian University – Dasmariñas
 PNTC Colleges
 Presbyterian Theological Seminary
 St. Francis of Assisi College Dasmariñas
 St. Paul Technological Institute of Cavite
 Southern Luzon College of Maritime, Science and Technology- Member of AMA Education System
 STI College - Dasmariñas
 St. Jude College – Dasmariñas
 Technological University of the Philippines – Cavite

Private schools 

 AISAT College-Dasmariñas
 Academia de San Rafael
 Academia Trinitas
 Accademia di Maria Mediatrici
 Amazing Grace Bible Baptist Christian Academy
 Asian Trinity School 
 Baptist Heritage Academy of Dasmariñas, Cavite
 Blessed Mary Academy
 Blessed School of Salitran
 Brentwood Academy of Dasmariñas
 Brightways Academy- Langkaan
 Brightways Academy- Guevarra St.
 Brooke's Point Academy
 Calvary Baptist Academy
 Caparas Science School
 Castilla de San Jose Academy
 Christian Vision School of Dasmariñas
 Cavite School of Life – Dasmariñas Campus
 Christ Life Academy Foundation
 Christ the King College of Cavite Foundation
 Christar Academy
 Colegio de Salitran, Inc.
 Corinthian Institute of Cavite
 Cowry Abalone Institute of Cavite
 Danhill Academy
 Dansart Angels Academy
 Dasmariñas Academy
 Divine College
 Divine Grace School of Dasmariñas
 Divine Saviour Smart Child School
 Escuela de Leonora
 Fiat Lux Academe- Dasmariñas Branch
 Gift of Wisdom Christian Institute
 Glenridge School
 God The Almighty Academy
 Gospel of Truth Learning School Inc.
 Grace Baptist Academy of Dasmariñas
 Great Mercy Academy of Cavite
 Holy Blessing Montessori International School
 Holy Redeemer School of Dasmariñas
 Holy Child Jesus Montessori School of Dasmariñas
 Humayao Christian Academy
 Immaculate Conception Academy (Special Science Campus, Dasmariñas Town Proper)
 Immaculate Conception Academy North Campus (Salitran)
 Immaculate Conception Academy West Campus (Amuntay Road, Zone 3)
 Immaculate Conception Academy East Campus (Antlers)
 Immaculate Conception Academy South Campus (Langkaan) 
 Infant Jesus Colleges Cavite
 Infant Jesus Montessori Center
 Islamic Studies Call and Guidance School
 Jabez Christian School
 Jesus Christ King of Kings and Lord of Lords Academy
 Jesu Mari School
 Jesus Our Shepherd Christian School of Cavite
 Jesus Son of Mary Academy
 Jesus the Heart of God Christian Academy
 Jogen Andrilla Academy

 Kerusso Christian Academy
 Kin Yang Academy
 La Escuela del Intelligencia Montessori
 Lancaan Learning Center
 Legacy of Wisdom
 Mahonri Academy and Science High School
 Marasigan Institute of Science and Technology
 Maria Ausiliatrice Montessori
 Marvelous Light Christian Academy
 Mary Auxillium Academy
 Mary Mediatrix of All Grace School
 Marymel Academy
 Metonoiah Academy of Dasmariñas
 Milbraen Educational Foundation
 Minaog Academy
 Mt. Carmel School of Cavite
 Mother Mary Integrated School
 National College of Science and Technology
 National Academy of Science and Technology, Member of NCST Education System (former Mary Help of Christians School)
 OzPhil College of Cavite Inc.
 Oxford Louise Academy of Dasma., Inc.
 Philippine Christian University
 Prince Aris Christian School
 Queen Anne School of Dasmariñas
 Rudishville Academy
 Saint Francis Academy
 Salawag Merryhills School of Dasmariñas
 Scoula Sorelle Faioli
 Seo Gwang Christian School, Inc.
 Shalom Learning Center
 Southern Luzon College of Business, Maritime, Science, and Technology, Member of AMA Education System
 St. Aloysius Academy of Dasmariñas
 St. Angela Merici Montessori
 St. Anthony Montessori Integrated School
 St. Francis of Assisi College – Dasmariñas Campus
 St. John Fisher School of Dasmariñas
 St. Joseph Academy of Dasmariñas
 St. Jude Academy of Dasmariñas
 St. Jude College of Dasmariñas
 St. Mary's Academe (MAIN- City Homes)
 St. Mary's Academe (Annex- Area-K)
 St. Nicholas de Myra School
 St. Pancras Academy
 St. Paul College Island Park 
 St. Peter Chanel School of Cavite
 St. Joseph Academy of Dasmariñas
 The First Uniting Christian School
 Torch of Wisdom Montessori
 Vel Maris School
 Warner Christian Academy
 Westhill International School
 Whiz World Montessori School
 WizBee International School
 Zoe Christian Educational Institution

Source: Private Masterlist of Schools 2011-2012 Dasma City - DepEd

Public schools 
Dasmariñas is divided in five public school districts: Dasmariñas I to V. Formerly, Dasmariñas was divided only into two school districts, until it was reapportioned after the municipality attained cityhood. School districts apply only in elementary schools.

Dasmariñas I 
 Dasmariñas Elementary School
 Delfin J. Jaranilla ES (Bucal ES)
 Francisco E. Barzaga Memorial School
 Humayao ES
 Langkaan ES
 Malinta ES
 New Era ES
 Piela ES
 Ramona S. Tirona Memorial School (San Agustin ES)
 Sabang ES
 Vicente P. Villanueva Memorial School (Pala-Pala ES)
 Zenaida H. Gana Memorial School (San Jose ES)

Dasmariñas II 
 Dasmariñas II CS (Dasmariñas BBES B)
 Dr. Jose P. Rizal ES (Dasmariñas BBES A-1)
 San Miguel ES (Dasmariñas BBES A-3)
 Salitran ES
 Sultan Esmael ES

Dasmariñas III 
 Paliparan III ES
 Paliparan ES
 Pintong Gubat ES
 Salawag ES

Dasmariñas IV 
 Burol ES
 San Nicolas ES (Dasmariñas BBES D)
 Santa Cruz ES (Dasmariñas BBES E)

Dasmariñas V 
 Bautista Subd. ES
 Sampaloc ES
 Santo Cristina ES (Dasmariñas BBES C)
 Victoria Reyes ES

Junior high schools 
 Congressional National High School
 Dasmariñas Integrated High School
 Dasmariñas North National High School
 Dasmariñas West National High School
 Dasmariñas East Integrated High School
 Edilberto S. Legaspi Integrated High School
 Francisco E. Barzaga National High School
 New Era National High School
 Pag-Asa National High School
 Paliparan National High School
 Paliparan II Integrated High School
 Langkaan II National High School
 Salawag National High School

Senior high schools 
 Congressional Integrated High School
 Dasmariñas Integrated High School
 Dasmariñas East Integrated High School
 Edilberto S. Legaspi Integrated High School
 Francisco E. Barzaga Integrated High School
 New Era Senior High School
 Paliparan II Integrated High School
 Paliparan III Senior High School
 Dr. Jose P Rizal Senior High School

References 

Dasmariñas
Dasmariñas